Weigel is a German surname. Notable people with this name include:

Beverly Weigel (born 1940), New Zealand Olympic athlete
Christian Ehrenfried Weigel, German scientist
Christoph Weigel the Elder (1654–1725), German engraver, art dealer and publisher
David Weigel, American journalist and political commentator
Detlef Weigel (born 1961), German American scientist
 (1927–1995), née Hofer, Austrian actress, married to Hans Weigel from 1951–1964
Erhard Weigel, German scientist
George Weigel, American writer and religious commentator
Hans Weigel, Austrian writer
Helene Weigel, Austrian actress
Herman Weigel, German film producer and screenwriter
Jannine Weigel (born 2000), Thai singer-songwriter and actress
Jaroslav Weigel (1931–2019), Czech actor, writer, playwright, comics writer and painter
Johanna Weigel "Madame Weigel" (1847–1940), designer and publisher of dressmaking patterns in Australia
Ronald Weigel (born 1959), German athlete
Teri Weigel, American porn actress
Valentin Weigel (1533–1588), German theologian, philosopher and mystical writer
William Weigel (1863–1936), US Army general commanding 88th Division in World War I

See also
 Grote & Weigel, American meat company
 Weigl
 Weigel Motors, British maker of automobiles (1907–10)
 Weigel Broadcasting, an American broadcasting company